Twelve Songs or 12 Songs can refer to:

Music

Classical compositions
Rachmaninov: Twelve Songs, Op. 14

Albums
12 Songs (Randy Newman album), a 1970 album by Randy Newman
12 Songs (Neil Diamond album), a 2005 album by Neil Diamond
12 Songs (Cory Branan album), a 2006 album by Cory Branan